Yulianti (born 18 July 1987) is an Indonesia retired badminton player. Yulianti was a successful badminton player who won Smiling Fish in mixed with Lingga Lie. In 2007, she won the Vietnam Open both doubles and mixed. In 2006 and 2007 she won the Indonesia International.

Achievements

BWF Grand Prix 
The BWF Grand Prix had two levels, the Grand Prix and Grand Prix Gold. It was a series of badminton tournaments sanctioned by the Badminton World Federation (BWF) and played between 2007 and 2017.

Women's doubles

Mixed doubles

BWF International Challenge/Series/Satellite 
Women's doubles

Mixed doubles

  BWF International Challenge tournament
  BWF International Series/Satellite tournament

References 

1987 births
Living people
People from Palembang
Sportspeople from South Sumatra
Indonesian female badminton players
21st-century Indonesian women
20th-century Indonesian women